516th may refer to:

516th Aeronautical Systems Wing, wing of the United States Air Force assigned to Wright-Patterson Air Force Base, Ohio
516th Air Defense Group, disbanded United States Air Force organization
516th Infantry Regiment (United States) ("Bastogne Bulldogs"), a glider-borne regiment of the U.S. 101st Airborne Division
516th Signal Brigade (United States), forward based major subordinate operations and maintenance command of the 311th Signal Command
516th Strategic Fighter Squadron, inactive United States Air Force unit

See also
516 (number)
516, the year 516 (DXVI) of the Julian calendar
516 BC